Kevin R. Abrams (born February 28, 1974) is a former professional American football cornerback. He was drafted by the Detroit Lions in the second round of the 1997 NFL Draft. He played college football at Syracuse.

College career
Abrams signed his letter of intent to play college football at Syracuse University in 1992, the same year as fellow defensive back Tyvan Sunday.

References

1974 births
American football cornerbacks
Detroit Lions players
Living people
Players of American football from Tampa, Florida
Syracuse Orange football players